

Celebrant as an Occupation/Profession
Celebrancy is a growing occupation worldwide. In the first instance, a celebrant is a ceremony provider for secular people, and to a lesser extent for persons who, for one reason or another, do not wish to avail themselves of a religious ceremony. It originated in the 1960s in Australia, as the initiative of the Australian statesman and Attorney General, Lionel Murphy. It later took hold in the New Zealand, Great Britain, Denmark, and the United States. Celebrants now exist, to a limited extent, in almost every country in the world.

New Jersey celebrant legislation
The Celebrant profession has been reported as a top “Encore Career” by CNN and Money Magazine, and a “best job” in Parade Magazine and other media for those who wish to have a fulfilling calling that is both meaningful and viable. In United States, in 2014, the state of New Jersey became the first state to pass the law that legislates “Civil Celebrants” to legally perform weddings. Other states of the Union are considering licensing Civil Celebrants based on the New Jersey model.

The Celebrant Foundation & Institute (CF&I) is a 501(c)(3) non-profit educational organization incorporated in New Jersey. CF&I is dedicated to the education, on line training and certification of professional officiants known and registered as certified Life-Cycle Celebrants. Celebrant Foundation & Institute was founded in 2001 and has headquarters in Montclair, New Jersey. The original forty or so celebrants were trained by the International College of Celebrancy based in Australia. The first graduate civil celebrant based on the Australian model was Dr Frank Hentschker of Montclair, New Jersey. From this group were chosen the institute faculty. It is a member of the International Federation of Celebrants.

What is a celebrant? 
A celebrant is an educated and trained ceremony provider committed to serving the community by co-creating personalized ceremonies for all occasions and life's milestones. Ceremonies include weddings, coupling and partnering ceremonies, renewal of vows, coming of age, baby welcomings/namings/blessings, adoptions, elder-wisdom/sage, memorials and end-of-life celebrations, funerals, house dedications, memorials, retirements, healing and transition ceremonies, divorce/uncoupling ceremonies, work related ceremonies, seasonal/nature based and community ceremonies.

Celebrants are professionals ceremony officiants who co-create with their client personalized ceremonies and rituals to serve basic needs of society and the individual. The celebrant and their client(s) collaborate to create one-of-a-kind ceremonies that reflect the clients’ beliefs, philosophy of life and personalities; not the Celebrant's. Because every ceremony is personalised and thus honest and authentic, celebrants have the potential to co-create ceremonies that have no equal.

Recognition and need
In 2007, the Celebrant profession was named by CNN and Money Magazine as the #3 best job for those over 50 and ready for a change.

The need for Celebrants in Society: 
Celebrancy answers the call to the increasing need of people throughout the world who come from diverse cultures, beliefs and backgrounds who wish to have a ceremony that expresses who they are at the very core whether they are religious or not, performed by professionally trained celebrants.  
The Pew Research Studies year after year show that a growing population of people worldwide, 70% of or more, state that they are not connected to a religion; many belong to an interfaith or non-church communities and/or they do not consider themselves as religious.  This demographic seeks and relies on  Celebrants to mark the milestones in their lives in a genuine way.

CF&I's mission is to pioneer the widespread use of relevant, customized ceremonies to honor the fullness of the human experience across the life cycle. CF&I seeks to increase opportunities to affirm and celebrate milestones and transitions for people from all walks of life through the training, certification, and ongoing support of professionally certified celebrants, and by providing public education, outreach, and advocacy.

CF&I Celebrant Training, Education and certification
The Celebrant Foundation & Institute offers educational programs taught via live, real time, web-based classes. Individuals looking for a change in career either as an independent, full-time, or part-time job have taken courses at the Celebrant Foundation in the pursuit of starting a career as a celebrant. Celebrant students follow the CF&I interdisciplinary education program that focuses on the history and art of ceremony, ritual, and rites of passage. It recognises the riches in the various world religions and cultural traditions, public speaking, ceremony writing, presentation skills and business skills.  
The certificate courses are: Wedding Celebrancy, Funeral Celebrancy and Ceremonies of healing and transition across the Life-Cycle. 
The institute offers an advanced course: Master of Celebrancy. 
Celebrant graduate alumni become part of their local or regional Celebrant alumni chapter community which supports them and their practice.
 
Who Becomes a Celebrant:
As a retirement career, supplement career or change of career, the CF&I offers training to become a professional ritual maker and ceremony specialist called a: certified Life-Cycle Celebrant.  The Celebrant career attracts both women and men, mostly 40 years of age and older, who enjoy and are proficient at: writing, public speaking, business and are open to creating and officiating or presiding over ceremonies for people from all walks of life.  Many Celebrant graduates have backgrounds as:  teachers, health and wellness professionals, social workers/therapists and life coaches, end-of-life professionals (funerals directors, hospice and death doulas), wedding professionals, lawyers, ministers/clergy, librarians, business entrepreneurs and artists.

See also
 Celebrant (Australia) - the civil celebrant movement began in Australia in 1973 and there established its basic principles.
 Celebrancy - Description of the profession of celebrancy.
 Lionel Murphy - Australian statesman who established Civil Celebrant in law  and culture.
 Funeral celebrant - Description, history, ideals and principles of funeral celebrancy.
 Dally Messenger III - notable celebrant who progressed civil celebrancy in Australia, New Zealand, the United Kingdom the United States and elsewhere.
 Ceremony - an explanation of the components of ceremony and the skill set necessary to perform ceremonies (civil and religious).
Officiant - synonym for celebrant.
 Celebrant Foundation and Institute Foundation in the USA
Humanist celebrant - describes the diaspora of Humanist Society celebrants throughout the world with a heavy emphasis on the non-religious.
Marriage officiant - religious and civil marriage in various religions and countries.

References

External links 

Celebrant marks life's major turns
Celebrant Charlotte Eulette interviewed

Wedding
Charities based in New Jersey